Tullibee, Tulliby or Tulaby may refer to:

Coregonus artedi, a fish commonly known as the Tullibee
, a submarine commissioned in 1943 and sunk in 1944
, a submarine in commission from 1960 to 1988
Tulaby Lake, a lake in Minnesota, United States
Tulliby Lake, a lake in Alberta, Canada